Theodoros Toromanidis (born 6 May 1993, in Xanthi) is a Greek footballer. He currently plays for Xanthi.

References

External links

Greek footballers
Living people
1994 births
Association football midfielders
Xanthi F.C. players
Footballers from Xanthi